Michael Sommer (born 15 January 1952) is a German trade unionist leader. He served for 12 years as the chairman of the German Confederation of Trade Unions (DGB).

Early life and career 
Born in Büderich, now part of Meerbusch, North Rhine-Westphalia, Sommer studied political sciences at Free University of Berlin from 1971 to 1980. He has been a member of the German Post Trade Union, which became part of ver.di in 2001, since 1971.

After his final degree, Sommer worked for the trade union. He climbed the ladder in the trade union becoming chairman of ver.di on 18 March 2001. A year later, on 28 May 2002, he was elected chairman of the DGB. He served for twelve years, retiring in 2014.

Other activities
 Aktion Deutschland Hilft (Germany's Relief Coalition), Member of the Board of Trustees
 Friedrich Ebert Foundation (FES), Deputy Chairman of the Board
 Volkswagen, Member of the Sustainability Council (since 2016)
 Volkswagen Foundation, Member of the Board of Trustees (since 2009)
 Schloss Neuhardenberg Foundation, chairman of the Board of Trustees
 KfW, Member of the supervisory board (2003-2014)

References

German trade unionists
1952 births
Living people
Officers Crosses of the Order of Merit of the Federal Republic of Germany
Recipients of the Order of Merit of Berlin
Leaders of the International Trade Union Confederation
People from North Rhine-Westphalia